1995 Cerezo Osaka season

Review and events

League results summary

League results by round

Competitions

Domestic results

J.League

Emperor's Cup

Player statistics

 † player(s) joined the team after the opening of this season.

Transfers

In:

Out: no data

Transfers during the season

In
 Kazunari Koga (from Osaka University of Commerce)
 Bernardo (on September)

Out
 Júnior (on June)
 Kazuhito Nigorisawa (loan to Tosu Futures on July)
 Kazuo Shimizu (loan to Gimnasia on July)
 Akinori Nishizawa (loan to FC Volendam on July)

Awards
J.League Best XI:  Hiroaki Morishima

References

Other pages
 J. League official site
 Cerezo Osaka official site

Cerezo Osaka
Cerezo Osaka seasons